Integral membrane protein 2A is a protein that in humans is encoded by the ITM2A gene.

Function
The protein encoded by this gene is  involved in osteo- and chondrogenic cellular differentiation (the cells which are responsible for the development of bone and cartilage respectively).

ITM2A  is also involved in activation of T-cells in the immune system and in myocyte differentiation.

References

Further reading

External links